The Paradise of Food is a book by Khalid Jawed which was published in 2022 by Juggernaut Books.

Award 
The book was awarded JCB Prize.

Critical reception 
Shuma Raha of Deccan Chronicle wrote "The Paradise of Food is a complex work that will fill you with disquiet, but if you read it, it will likely leave an indelible impression on you.", Chintan Girish Modi of Moneycontrol wrote "Pick up this book if you do not mind reading about worms in intestines, people spitting phlegm, lizards falling into boiling milk, and bloodstains that look like korma gravy." and Saloni Sharma of Scroll.in wrote "Despite its eschewal of realism, this novel is a text cognisant of the political climate it has been written in.".

The book has been also reviewed by Ekram Khawar of The Indian Wire, Syed Saad Ahmed of Hindustan Times, Bindu Menon of The Tribune India and The Times of India.

References 

2022 novels
Indian novels